Isotype can refer to: 

 Isotype (biology), a duplicate of the holotype of a species
 Isotype (crystallography), a synonym for isomorph
 Isotype (immunology), an antibody class according to its Fc region
 Isotype (picture language), a method of showing social, technological, biological and historical connections in pictorial form
 Isotype (song), 2017 song by Orchestral Manoeuvres in the Dark

See also
 Isotope (disambiguation)
 Isoform